Three ships of the Royal Navy have borne the name HMS Desperate, the adjective having the sense of "having reckless abandon in the pursuit of an extreme desire":

 , a 12-gun gun brig launched in 1805, converted to a mortar brig in 1811 and sold in 1814.
 , a wooden  screw sloop launched in 1849 and broken up in 1865. 
 , a Thornycroft two funnel, 30-knot destroyer (classified as a  destroyer in 1912) launched in 1896 and sold for breaking in 1920.

A further two vessels were ordered and later cancelled:
 HMS Desperate (1918), a  light cruiser ordered in March 1918 and cancelled in November the same year.
 HMS Desperate (1945), a  destroyer ordered in March 1945 and cancelled in January 1946.

See also
 , an 8-gun schooner in service from 1799 to 1811.

Notes

References
 

Royal Navy ship names